Lieutenant General Adi Meherji Sethna, PVSM, AVSM was an Indian Army General who served as the Vice Chief of Army Staff.

After graduating from The Doon School and Allahabad University he was commissioned into the Indian Army and posted to the 6th Rajputana Rifles on 21 May 1944. He began his military career fighting in Malaya during the Second World War. 

He was one of the few Indians to attend both the Royal College of Defence Studies and the Camberly Staff College in England. He was ADC to the second Governor-General of India C. Rajagopalachari as well as Dr. Rajendra Prasad

He also played an active role in the strategy for the Bangladesh campaign and was awarded India's third highest civilian award, the Padma Bhushan. He
guided the Delhi Parsi Anjuman and the Federation of Zoroastrian Anjumans for 20 years. Adi Sethna was also the Founder President of the UNESCO Parsi-Zoroastrian Project (PARZOR). He died of cancer in 2006.

References

Parsi people
The Doon School alumni
University of Allahabad alumni
Indian generals
2006 deaths
Recipients of the Padma Bhushan in civil service
British Indian Army officers
Recipients of the Param Vishisht Seva Medal
Vice Chiefs of Army Staff (India)
Commandants of Defence Services Staff College
Graduates of the Royal College of Defence Studies
Graduates of the Staff College, Camberley